Montesi is an Italian surname. Notable people with the surname include:

Greg Montesi (born 1959), American rower
Maurizio Montesi (born 1952), Italian gymnast
Wilma Montesi (1932–1953), Italian woman murdered in Rome

Fictional characters
Victoria Montesi, a character in the Marvel Comics universe

Italian-language surnames